Jamiro Gregory Monteiro Alvarenga (born 23 November 1993), commonly known as Jamiro, is a professional footballer who plays as a midfielder for the San Jose Earthquakes of Major League Soccer. Born in the Netherlands, he represents the Cape Verde national team.

Early life
Monteiro was raised by his Cape Verde immigrant parents in Rotterdam, Netherlands. Often viewed as undersized, at age 20, Monteiro's skills at football eventually landed him the opportunity to join the U21 system at FC Dordrecht. By 21, he eventually sign a contract with the U21 system at SC Cambuur with the intention of making the first team.

Club career

Metz
On 28 July 2018, Jamiro joined Ligue 2 side Metz on a three-year deal.

Philadelphia Union
In March 2019, Monteiro secured a four-month loan move to the Philadelphia Union of Major League Soccer with options to extend the loan and purchase. His performance with the Union justified the team to extend his loan to the conclusion of the 2019 season. Monteiro finished his first season in MLS making 26 appearances, 22 of which as part of the starting lineup. He scored four goals and provided nine assists ultimately helping the Union to their first ever playoff win. On January 10, 2020, contrary to previous reports of him returning to Metz, Monteiro was signed permanently by the Union for a club-record fee of $2 million. He signed a three-year deal with the club as a Designated Player. Monteiro finished the 2020 season with four goals and four assists contributing the Union's first major trophy in the 2020 Supporters' Shield.

San Jose Earthquakes 
On 14 February 2022, Monteiro signed for the San Jose Earthquakes. In exchange for his transfer, the Philadelphia Union received $250,000 in allocation money, an international roster slot, and up to $200,000 in performance-based allocation money. He signed for San Jose as a Designated Player. On May 19, 2022, Monteiro was awarded MLS Player of the Week for Week 12 of the 2022 season in recognition of his brace in a 3-2 win over the Portland Timbers.

International career
Jamiro was born in Netherlands to parents of Cape Verdean descent. In March 2016, Monteiro received his first international call for the Cape Verde national team for 2017 Africa Cup of Nations qualification. He made his debut in a 2–0 loss against Morocco as a late sub. On October 7, 2021, Monteiro scored his first national team goal during the second round of the 2022 FIFA World Cup qualification; an equalizer versus Liberia.

Career statistics

Club

International

International goals
Scores and results list Cape Verde's goal tally first.

Honours
Philadelphia Union
Supporters' Shield: 2020

Individual
CONCACAF Champions League Team of the Tournament: 2021

References

External links
 
 Voetbal International profile 
 
 

1993 births
Living people
Citizens of Cape Verde through descent
Cape Verdean footballers
Association football midfielders
FC Metz players
Philadelphia Union players
San Jose Earthquakes players
Ligue 2 players
Major League Soccer players
Designated Players (MLS)
Cape Verde international footballers
Cape Verdean expatriate footballers
Cape Verdean expatriate sportspeople in France
Expatriate footballers in France
Cape Verdean expatriate sportspeople in the United States
Expatriate soccer players in the United States
Footballers from Rotterdam
Dutch footballers
SC Cambuur players
Heracles Almelo players
Eredivisie players
Eerste Divisie players
Dutch expatriate footballers
Dutch expatriate sportspeople in France
Dutch expatriate sportspeople in the United States
Dutch sportspeople of Cape Verdean descent
2021 Africa Cup of Nations players